Timothy Paul Stokes (born March 16, 1950) is a former American football offensive lineman in the National Football League for the Los Angeles Rams, Washington Redskins, Green Bay Packers, and the New York Giants.  He played college football at the University of Oregon and was drafted in the third round of the 1973 NFL Draft.

1950 births
Living people
Players of American football from Oakland, California
American football offensive linemen
Oregon Ducks football players
Los Angeles Rams players
Washington Redskins players
Green Bay Packers players
New York Giants players